Schloss Köpenick is a Baroque water palace of the Hohenzollern electors of Brandenburg which stands on an island in the Dahme River surrounded by an English-style park and gives its name to Köpenick, a district of Berlin.

The castle was originally built on the foundations of a Slavic castle (6th century) in 1558 as a hunting lodge by order of Elector Joachim II Hector of Brandenburg. The building in a Renaissance style was located on the river island at the site of the former medieval fort. Joachim II died here in 1571. In 1631 it served as the headquarters of King Gustavus Adolphus of Sweden, where he - without results - asked his brother-in-law Elector George William for assistance in the Thirty Years' War.

Frederick I of Prussia had the lodge rebuilt and enlarged from 1677 and lived here together with his first wife Elizabeth Henrietta of Hesse-Kassel. In 1730 Frederick II of Prussia, then Crown Prince, and his friend Hans Hermann von Katte faced the court-martial for desertion at Schloss Köpenick. Today the castle surrounded by a small park serves as the Museum of Decorative Arts, run by the Prussian Cultural Heritage Foundation as part of the Berlin State Museums.

Since 1963, Köpenick Palace has been used by the Kunstgewerbemuseum as an exhibition space. Being renovated in 2004, the palace accommodates museum of arts with the permanent exhibition "RoomArt", featuring the decorative arts of the Renaissance, Baroque and Rococo periods. The museum also presents the outstanding masterworks in interior design from the 16th to 18th centuries.

Further reading 

 Josef Batzhuber: Garten der Schlossinsel Köpenick, Stadtbezirk Treptow-Köpenick; in: Bund Heimat und Umwelt in Deutschland (Hg.): Weißbuch der historischen Gärten und Parks in den neuen Bundesländern; 2., überarbeitete Auflage, Bonn 2005; ; S. 34–36.
 Folkwin Wendland: Berlins Gärten und Parke von der Gründung der Stadt bis zum ausgehenden neunzehnten Jahrhundert; (Das klassische Berlin); Propyläen: Berlin 1979; ; S. 338–341.
 Raimund Hertzsch: Schloß Köpenick; (Der historische Ort 90); Kai Homilius Verlag: Berlin 1997; .
 Lothar Lambacher (Hrsg.): Schloss Köpenick. Archäologie, Baugeschichte, Nutzung; Schnell & Steiner: Regensburg 2005; .
 Günter Schade: Schloß Köpenick. Ein Streifzug durch die Geschichte der Köpenicker Schloßinsel; Staatliche Museen zu Berlin, Kunstgewerbemuseum: 4., verbesserte Ausgabe, Berlin 1975.
 Staatliche Museen zu Berlin (Hrsg.): Schloß Köpenick. Kunstgewerbemuseum: Europäisches Kunsthandwerk aus zehn Jahrhunderten; Staatliche Museen zu Berlin, Kunstgewerbemuseum: Berlin 1976.

External links
 Schloss Köpenick - official site at Berlin State Museums

Houses completed in 1558
Baroque architecture in Germany
Palaces in Berlin
Museums in Berlin
Buildings and structures in Treptow-Köpenick
Water castles in Germany
Hunting lodges in Germany
Decorative arts museums in Germany
Royal residences in Berlin
Frederick I of Prussia
Gustavus Adolphus of Sweden